Sheykhan Karag (also Romanized as Sheykhān Karag; also known as Karag and Sheykhān Gorg) is a village in Sand-e Mir Suiyan Rural District, Dashtiari District, Chabahar County, Sistan and Baluchestan Province, Iran. At the 2006 census, its population was 430, in 88 families.

References 

Populated places in Chabahar County